The Lebanese American University (LAU) is a secular and private American university located in Lebanon. It is chartered by the board of regents of the University of the State of New York and is accredited by the New England Commission of Higher Education (NECHE). It has two campuses and offers 58 degrees.

Campuses 
LAU has two main campuses, one in the capital Beirut and another in the city of Byblos, 35 kilometers north of Beirut. LAU also has a small campus located in New York, NY.

The Byblos campus, inaugurated in 1991, hosts the nursing, medicine, engineering and pharmacy programs, while most of the other programs are offered in both campuses.

LAU's Beirut and Byblos campuses are respectively 2.54 hectares and 15.94 hectares wide. In both campuses, students have access to libraries, gymnasiums, residence halls, theaters, wireless internet, computer centers, laboratories, and academic support services.

On June 30, 2009, LAU acquired the LAU Medical Center-Rizk Hospital (LAUMC-RH).[14] LAUMC-RH offers medical services such as radiology and imaging, dialysis, endoscopy, dermatology, ophthalmology, IVF, and cardiology.[15] In 2013, LAU moved its New York City headquarters to mid-town Manhattan and opened a new Executive Center in downtown Beirut.

In April 2017, the LAU broke ground in its Byblos Campus on a new US$7 Million sports center, the "Antoun Nabil Sehnaoui - SGBL Athletics Center", donated by Lebanese banker and philanthropist Antoun Sehnaoui. The new center will feature an 8,500 square meter athletics center, a swimming pool, a multipurpose indoor court, outdoor football, basketball and tennis fields, as well as a gym and several other related amenities.

Accreditations, Affiliations and Charters 

The Lebanese American University is chartered by the board of regents of the University of the State of New York. It is accredited by the New England Commission of Higher Education (NECHE). Its business majors (as well its economics major) are some of the few accredited by the elite Association to Advance Collegiate Schools of Business.

Some of its programs are also accredited:

LAU's Bachelor of Architecture degree is recognized by the French Ministry of Culture & Communication, and has been recently accredited by the NAAB (accreditation board).

Academics and Rankings  
LAU has seven schools divided into several departments.
 School of Arts and Sciences: Communication Arts, Computer Science and Mathematics, Education, English, Humanities, Natural Sciences, Social Sciences.
 School of Architecture and Design: Art and Design, Architecture and Interior Design, Foundation Program.
 Adnan Kassar School of Business: Economics, Finance and Accounting, Hospitality Management and Marketing, Information Technology and Operations Management, Management Studies.
 School of Engineering: Civil, Electrical and Computer, Industrial and Mechanical.
 Gilbert and Rose-Marie Chagoury School of Medicine.
 Alice Ramez Chagoury School of Nursing.
 School of Pharmacy.
The university is ranked number 14 in the Arab region and 557 in the world in the 2021 QS World University Rankings.

Student life

Play Productions 

The university has three theaters—Gulbenkian and Irwin in Beirut, and Selina Korban in Byblos. Student productions are required of certain majors, and are presented throughout the academic year. The university also offers two major productions, in the fall and spring, and an annual international theater festival that attracts groups from other Middle Eastern universities.

Varsity Sports 

Basketball, football, handball, volleyball, tennis, table tennis, swimming, and rugby teams participate in various local, regional and international collegiate tournaments.

Student Governance 

Students can participate in the decision-making process by voting and running in elections for the Campus Student Councils and the University Student Council, as well as the Graduate Student Committees.

Libraries

LAU has one library in Beirut (Riyad Nassar Library) and two in Byblos (Joseph G. Jabbra Library and Health Sciences library). The New York Headquarters and Academic Center also has its own library.

The Riyad Nassar Library in Beirut has more than 480 000 print books and 11 000 e-Books. It also hosts special collections related to women's studies, education, Islamic art, and architecture, as well as children's books.

The Joseph G. Jabbra Library in Byblos, inaugurated in November 2018, is home to thousands of books and records and houses several study rooms and state of the art library equipment.

The Arab Institute for Women (AiW) 

In 1973, LAU established The Arab Institute for Women (AiW), previously known as the Institute for Women's Studies in the Arab World (IWSAW), with a mission to promote women's empowerment and gender equality in – and for – the Arab world. The institute works on five key areas: Education, Research, Development Projects, Outreach, and LAU Engagement.

Alumni

Alumni chapters 
LAU has over 40,000 alumni and 42 chapters around the world, including Athens (Greece), Beirut, Byblos, Detroit (USA), Dubai (UAE), London (UK), Montreal (Canada).

Notable alumni 
 Lamis Mustafa Alami,  Current Minister of Education in the Palestinian Authority (class of 1964).
 Rose Ghurayeb, Lebanese writer and professor of Arabic literature 
 Saloua Raouda Choucair, Lebanese painter and sculptor (class of 1938).
 Selim El Sayegh, former Lebanese Minister of Social Affairs (class of 1983).
 Tamirace Fakhoury, Lebanese poet and professor at LAU (class of 1999).
 Sethrida Geagea, member of the Lebanese Parliament (class of 1994).
 Saniya Habboub, Lebanese medical doctor.
 Laury Haytayan, MENA officer in the Natural Resource Charter framework, and civil activist in Lebanon.
 Zaven Kouyoumdjian, Lebanese talk show host, television personality, media consultant, and author.
 Rima Maktabi, TV presenter, news anchor and journalist at CNN and Al-Arabiya News channel (class of 2003).
Thurayyā Malḥas, poet and professor at BCW (class of 1945).
 May Nasr, Lebanese singer and musician (class of 1988).
 Salwa Nassar, nuclear physicist.
 Octavia Nasr, a former CNN journalist and current cohost of MBC's "Kalam Nawaem" (class of 1987).
 Nadine Wilson Njeim, Miss Lebanon 2007, actress and TV presenter (class of 2012).
 Mounira Solh, founder of Al Amal Institute for the Disabled and one of the first Lebanese women running for parliament (class of 1933).
 Vick Vanlian, late founder of interior design company Vick Vanlian / V World SAL
Toufic Jaber, Lebanon ambassador to Serbia, Macedonia, Montenegro, Bosnia, Croatia, Slovenia and Kosovo
Elie Habib, the co-founder of Anghami

References

External links
 

 
1924 establishments in Mandatory Syria
Universities in Lebanon
Former women's universities and colleges
Educational institutions established in 1924